The Wireless Festival is a rap and urban music festival that takes place every year in London, England. It is owned and managed by Live Nation. While it started as primarily a rock and pop festival, in recent years it has focused on hip hop and other urban music. Headline acts since 2010 have included Jay-Z, Kanye West, Justin Timberlake, Rihanna, Bruno Mars and Stormzy.

From its inception in 2005 until 2008, the festival was sponsored by telecommunications company O2, and was called the O2 Wireless Festival. From 2009 to 2012, the main sponsor was Barclaycard and the festival renamed to Barclaycard Wireless Festival. For 2013, the sponsor changed to Yahoo!, and was renamed to Yahoo! Wireless. In 2015, the sponsor became the fashion retailer New Look. Sponsorship then changed to delivery company Gopuff in 2021, and has remained the same for the 2022 and 2023 editions of the festival.

The capacity of the 2023 event is 49,999. Adjacent festivals were held in Leeds in 2006 and 2007, as well as Birmingham in 2014. In 2017, Live Nation also established Wireless Germany, in Frankfurt. As well as Wireless Middle East in Abu Dhabi

History

2005

The first festival took place in June 2005 and was in Hyde Park only. Tickets were £35 a day. Some of the acts on the line-up were (headline acts in bold):

 Friday, 24 June: New Order, Moby, Hard-Fi, The Bravery, Graham Coxon, The Dresden Dolls, The Dears, Rilo Kiley
 Saturday, 25 June: Basement Jaxx, M.I.A., LCD Soundsystem, Death In Vegas, Lady Sovereign, Killa Kela, Mylo, Roots Manuva, Stereo MCs
 Wednesday, 29 June: Keane, Echo & the Bunnymen, Supergrass, James Blunt, Brendan Benson, Rufus Wainwright, Martha Wainwright
 Thursday, 30 June: Kasabian, Editors, The Rakes, The Others, Ladytron, Soulwax, Peter Doherty, JJ72, Cut Copy

2006

In 2006, the festival played in both Hyde Park and Harewood House. Tickets were £37.51 per day.

The Hyde Park festival ran from 21 to 25 June and on the bill were:
The Strokes, Belle & Sebastian, Dirty Pretty Things, Super Furry Animals, The Raconteurs, Gogol Bordello, The Like
David Gray, Fun Lovin' Criminals, KT Tunstall, Violent Femmes
Massive Attack, The Flaming Lips, Pharrell, Gnarls Barkley, Metric, Damian Marley
James Blunt, Zero 7, Eels, Beth Orton, Paolo Nutini
Depeche Mode, Goldfrapp, OK Go, The Dears, The Fratellis, Mystery Jets

The Harewood House festival ran from 24 to 25 June and tickets were £32.50 for the first day and £37.50 for the second. It featured:
Massive Attack, Goldfrapp, DJ Shadow, Pharrell, Gnarls Barkley, Terry Callier, Just Jack, Sway
The Who, Super Furry Animals, The Flaming Lips, The Zutons, Eels

2007

Tickets for both venues went on sale on 16 March 2007 and the festival took place between 14 and 17 June in Hyde Park, and 15–17 June at Harewood House. Tickets were £40 for one day, £75 for two, £105 for three or £135 for four days.

The acts for both Hyde Park and Harewood House were:
The White Stripes, Queens of the Stone Age, Air, Satellite Party, The Bees, The Thrills, The Sounds, Dredg, Polytechnic, Ghosts, Connan and the Mockasins, Far From The Dance, Kissaway Trail, Pete and the Pirates, The Scare
Daft Punk, LCD Soundsystem, Klaxons, CSS, Plan B, New Young Pony Club, Calvin Harris, Simian Mobile Disco, Digitalism,
Kaiser Chiefs, Editors, The Cribs, The Rakes, The Twang, The Only Ones, Kate Nash, Ripchord, The Duke Spirit, Polysics, Mumm-Ra, The Pigeon Detectives, You Say Party! We Say Die!, Los Campesinos!, and Under the Influence of Giants. Kaiser Chiefs selected the line-up for the day they were headlining (Saturday at Harewood House and Sunday in Hyde Park).
The acts which performed the extra date in Hyde Park were:
Faithless, Badly Drawn Boy, Kelis, Just Jack and Cat Empire.

For the first time, the Leeds festival offered camping facilities at the festival. Campers were allowed to stay on Lord Harewood's land for £25 for as many festival days as they wished. There were 3 stages this year, and the O2 Blueroom where only O2 customers were allowed to enter.

2008

The 2008 O2 Wireless Festival spanned 4 days in Hyde Park, and was the last to carry the O2 sponsorship. An attempt to hold a parallel festival in Leeds similar to the Reading and Leeds Festivals arrangement was unsuccessful, and instead a variety of club nights featuring billed artists were held. Tickets were £45 per day.

The line-up was as follows:

 Thursday, 3 July: Jay-Z, Mark Ronson, Hot Chip, Róisín Murphy, David Jordan, The Cool Kids, Hercules and Love Affair, Alice Smith, Kano, Saul Williams, Lethal Bizzle, Elliot Minor, Pete and the Pirates, The Stiff Dylans, Sparkadia, The Hot Melts, Electric Dolls, Beans On Toast, Red Snapper, Annie, Bryn Christophers, Kid Sisters, Tinie Tempah, Yelle
 Friday, 4 July: Morrissey, Beck, The Wombats, Guillemots, Dirty Pretty Things, Lightspeed Champion, The National, Siouxsie, The Courteeners, Black Kids, The Rascals, The Hosts, Kristeen Young, Howling Bells, Magic Wands, The Whigs, Nicole Atkins and the Sea, Mon Ouisch, The Fashion, The Reprieve, New York Dolls, Get Cape. Wear Cape. Fly, Liam Finn, Apollo Sunshine, Seawolf, Jaguar Love, Peter and the Wolf
 Saturday, 5 July: Fatboy Slim, Deadmau5, Robyn, Bootsy Collins, Neon Neon, Cornershop, Ryan Shaw, Underworld, MSTRKRFT, Does It Offend You, Yeah?, Sam Sparro, Cut Copy, Dan Le Sac Vs Scroobius Pip, The Whip, Junkie XL, Akala, Audio Bullys, Cagedbaby, Japanese Pop Stars, Familien, Yacht, Booka Shade, Why?, Das Pop, InnerPartySystem
 Sunday, 6 July: Counting Crows, Ben Harper, Powderfinger, Goo Goo Dolls, Eddy Grant, Magic Christian, The Hold Steady, Bowling For Soup, Donavon Frankenreiter, Delays, Melee, Luke White, Galactic with Lyrics Born and Boots Riley, Roy World, Joe Purdy, Amy Studt, Dawn Kinnard, The Galvatrons, Silver Seas, Chief, Nellie McKay, Alice Smith, Ryan Shaw, Sons of Albion, Pablo Francisco, Jamie Kennedy, Jo Koy, Gabriel Iglesias

2009

The 2009 festival was sponsored by Barclaycard and was cut from four to two days in Hyde Park. Tickets were £45 for one day or £80 for both. The line-up was as follows:

 Saturday, 4 July: Basement Jaxx, The Streets, Dizzee Rascal, Paul Oakenfold, Metric, Jack Peñate, Saint Etienne, Afrika Bambaataa & the Soulsonic Force, Frankmusik, Sneaky Sound System, N.A.S.A., Tommy Sparks, Delphic, Filthy Dukes, Digitalism, Skint & Demoralised, Master Shortie, Japanese Popstars, Phenomenal Handclap Band
 Sunday, 5 July: Kanye West, Noisettes, Alesha Dixon, Calvin Harris, N-Dubz, Tinchy Stryder, Q-Tip, Flo Rida, Kid Cudi, Daniel Merriweather, Lady Sovereign, Young Jeezy, Mr Hudson, Chipmunk, Ironik, Example, Florence Rawlings, Zarif, Steve Appleton, The Black and White Years, Diversity, Ratatat

2010

The 2010 Wireless Festival was increased to three days and took place from 2 July to 4 July 2010. Tickets were £47.50 for one day, £85 for two and £110 for three days. The line-up was as follows:

 Friday, 2 July: P!nk, The Ting Tings, Gossip, The Temper Trap, Plan B, Bowling For Soup, Hockey, Daisy Dares You, Neon Hitch, Taylor Hawkins and the Coattail Riders, Bluey Robinson
 Saturday, 3 July: LCD Soundsystem, Snoop Dogg, 2ManyDJs (aka Soulwax), Kids on Bridges, The Big Pink, DJ Shadow, UNKLE, Missy Elliott, The Hundred in the Hands, Phenomenal Handclap Band
 Sunday, 4 July: Jay-Z, Lily Allen, Friendly Fires, Slash, Mr Hudson, dan le sac Vs Scroobius Pip, Chipmunk, Tinie Tempah, Chase & Status, D12, Wiley, Roll Deep, J. Cole, Chiddy Bang, Wale, Professor Green, Laura Steel, Talay Riley, McLean, Bluey Robinson, Hesta Prynn.

The Sunday date sold out in record time, three weeks before the festival.

2011

The 2011 Wireless Festival was held from Friday 1 July to Sunday 3 July 2011. Tickets were £48.50 (Saturday/Sunday) or £49.50 (Friday) for one day, £92 for two and £130 for three days. The Black Eyed Peas headlined the Friday, The Chemical Brothers on the Saturday, and Pulp reformed after ten years to play the Sunday and other festivals in 2011. The Black Eyed Peas date had sold out by the end of June, while tickets for the other two days remained on sale until the festival.

2012
The 2012 Wireless Festival was held from Friday 6 July to Sunday 8 July. Tickets went on general sale on 18 November 2011, priced at £49.50 (Friday/Saturday) and £52.50 (Sunday), plus booking fee. All tickets for the Rihanna day sold out by the end of March, a new record for the festival.

The acts which played were:

2013

The 2013 event was moved to the Queen Elizabeth Olympic Park in Stratford after Live Nation pulled out of the tender for Hyde Park due to curfew issues. The festival was held from Friday 12 July to Sunday 14 July 2013, and tickets were priced at £57.50 for day tickets and £110 for two days, plus booking fees. The event was being sponsored by Yahoo!.

The line-up for the festival was:

2014
In February 2014 it was confirmed that Wireless Festival 2014 would be held at Finsbury Park, London and Perry Park, Birmingham. The event was held over the weekend of 4–6 July 2014, on three stages. London day tickets were priced at £71.50 while Birmingham day tickets were priced at £68.75. Weekend tickets for London went on sale at £210 while Birmingham weekend tickets were set at £172. On 3 July, the day before the first day of the festival, it was widely reported that Drake had pulled out due to illness, (making it the second time he had pulled out of a Wireless Festival). This was confirmed on the festival's social media sites and organisers announced that Kanye West would play instead of Drake in London, and Rudimental (who had been the support for Drake) would headline the Saturday in Birmingham with a special extended set featuring very special guests. The organisers also offered those attending on Saturday in Birmingham £20 of "Wireless Credit" which was redeemable against any concessions, merchandise stands and funfair attractions at the event.

London

Birmingham

2015
On 31 January 2015, it was confirmed that the festival would be held in Finsbury Park between 3 and 5 July. The lineup was confirmed via the festival's Twitter page, with confirmation that Drake would return to the festival following his cancellation in 2014. It was also revealed that David Guetta and Nicki Minaj would perform as co-headliners on the Sunday, and that Avicii and Kendrick Lamar would be co-headlining on Saturday. As it's the festival's tenth birthday, there will be a special 'birthday' event on Sunday 28 June.
Since the lineup was announced, several artists have had to cancel their appearance. In early June, Big Sean removed the Wireless appearance from his tour's website and he no longer appeared on the Wireless website's lineup. Around the same time, Boy Better Know were added to the Wireless 10 event. On 14 June, Stromae had to cancel his Wireless appearance amongst other summer dates, after suffering a reaction to anti-malaria drugs whilst on his tour of Sub-Saharan Africa. Someome tweeted a day later to say she would also be cancelling a number of summer dates, including Wireless, due to having to undergo vocal chord surgery.
The Friday sold out by the end of April, whilst the other three dates remained on sale until the festival.

2016
Wireless Festival 2016 was held on the weekend of 8–10 July at Finsbury Park. The lineup was announced on 9 March, with conformation that Calvin Harris would be Headlining Friday, Chase & Status & J. Cole co-headling Saturday and Kygo & Boy Better Know co-headlining Sunday. Tickets were on sale 2 Days Later. On 16 March, Dua Lipa was announced for Friday. 3 days later Lady Leshurr was announced for Saturday. On 11 May, Wizkid and 99 Souls were announced for Friday, Natalie La Rose, Angel, Shakka, Rude Kid, KStewart, The Manor, Jorja Smith, and A2 were announced for Saturday, Fergie, Big Sean, Metro Boomin, Jay Sean, Ghetts, Thomas Jack, Fekky, Elf Kid, Sonny Digital and Father were announced for Sunday. On the same day, Lady Leshurr was moved to Friday. On 21 May Kyla was announced for Saturday. Wizkid had pulled out due to Visa Problems.

2017
Wireless Festival 2017 was held on the weekend of 7–9 July at Finsbury Park. The lineup was announced on 23 February, with conformation that Chance The Rapper would be headlining Friday, Skepta would be headlining Saturday and The Weeknd would be headlining Sunday. Tickets were on sale on the same day. On 28 March, Fetty Wap and Geko were announced for Friday, Travis Scott was announced for Saturday, Bugzy Malone and Kojo Funds were announced for Sunday. On the same day, Cadet was moved from Sunday to Saturday. On 30 June, AJ Tracey was announced for Friday. Lil Uzi Vert was also part of the lineup, but had pulled out, due to continued exhaustion. He has been replaced by Pusha T. Wiley was also part of the lineup, but had also pulled out, due to delays with his travel plan. He
has been replaced by Lethal Bizzle.

2018
Wireless festival was held on 6–8 July at Finsbury Park. The line up was announced 22 January with confirmation that J. Cole will be headlining the Friday, Stormzy the Saturday and DJ Khaled with others the Sunday, The Festival was fully sold out within a day. On 9 April Cardi B announced her pregnancy, therefore at the same time, she pulled out. 3 days later Raye, Russ, Suspect, Big Shaq, Sneakbo, Davido, Ms Banks, Majid Jordan and Last Night In Paris were added to the line up. On 14 May, AJ x Deno, EO, M Huncho, Just Banco, Big Heath, Romzy and Yung Fume were added to the line up. On 3 July, J Hus pulled out, due to legal issues. Fredo also pulled out due to unforeseen circumstances. On the same day, Krept & Konan, Chip, Avelino, D-Block Europe and Ambush were added to the line up. On 5 July, MoStack got moved from Saturday to Friday. On the same day Trippie Redd had pulled out, due to unforeseen circumstances. On the day that DJ Khaled was meant to be headlining, It was announced he had pulled out due to travel issues. He was replaced by a surprise guest, who turned out to be Drake.

2019
The Wireless Festival was held on 5–7 July at Finsbury Park. The Line Up was announced on 28 January with confirmation that Cardi B and Migos would be co-headlining Friday, Travis Scott headlining Saturday, and ASAP Rocky headlining Sunday. On 9 February, Cadet, who was meant to be performing on Saturday, died. Wireless kept his performance set, in order to remember him. On 13 March, One Acen, Lotto Boyzz, THEY., Tiwa Savage, Lady Sanity and Lil Yachty were added to the line up. In April, Loski pulled out for legal issues. On the 8 May, Yungen was added to the line up. On the 14 June Megan Thee Stallion was added to the line up. On 20 June, it was announced that a number of acts would be streamed globally, live in virtual reality, by using a platform provided by MelodyVR. Streamed content would also be available via Wireless' Facebook page and MelodyVR's Android and iOS VR/360 apps. On 1 July, Polo G was added to the line up. Two days later Headie One and Lil Uzi Vert pulled out for unknown reasons. Jay1 replaced One and a surprise guest that replaced Vert was Skepta. Also, ASAP Rocky pulled out, for legal issues. On the day before he was meant to headline, J Hus was added to the line up and it was also announced that Rae Sremmurd would be headlining Sunday. At the same time, Polo G cancelled his performance, due to the birth of his child, and was replaced by Aitch.

2020
The sixteenth edition of Wireless Festival was due to take place from the 3rd to the 5th of July 2020 at Finsbury Park, London. In social media statements posted on the 23rd of March 2021, it was announced that the festival would be moved to Crystal Palace Park and would return from September 10 to 12 2021.

2021
In social media statements posted on the 23rd of March 2021, it was announced that the festival would be moved to Crystal Palace Park and would return run from at a later date than usual, due to Covid, on September 10 to 12 2021.

2022
On February 25, 2022, it was announced that Wireless Festival would take place in Crystal Palace Park on 1–3 July, while a second and third festival would be held in Finsbury Park and the National Exhibition Centre in Birmingham, both on 8–10 July. Seven headliners will be split between the three locations: A$AP Rocky, J. Cole, Tyler, the Creator, Dave, Cardi B, Nicki Minaj, and SZA.

2023
It was announced that Gopuff delivers Wireless 2023 would be once again returning back for just one weekend, at Finsbury Park. The event is due to run on the 7th, 8 and 9 July with headline artists Playboi Carti, Travis Scott and D-Block Europe, and 50 Cent as a special guest, all of which as UK Festival Exclusives. Saturday day tickets sold out within 60 minutes of going on sale.

Sponsors

See also

List of music festivals in the United Kingdom

References

External links

Wireless Festival Official Website
Virtual Festivals' Wireless Festival page
Sights and sounds from Wireless Festival 2006: The week in pictures
Wireless 2010 News
Wireless Festival News

Music festivals in London
Music festivals in Leeds
Hyde Park, London
2005 establishments in England
Music festivals established in 2005